Greya solenobiella is a moth of the  family Prodoxidae. In the United States it is found from south-western Oregon south to California, where it is found along the coast and in the Sierra Nevada. The habitat consists of grassy areas in dry to moderately moist oak or mixed deciduous forests.

The forewings are white, irrorated (speckled) with gray. Females are usually more white than males. The hindwings are uniformly gray. The species is highly variable in wing pattern.

The larvae feed on Yabea microcarpa. Young larvae feed on the developing seeds of their host plant.

References

Moths described in 1880
Prodoxidae